The Toyota ZZ engine family is a straight-4 piston engine series. The ZZ series uses a die-cast aluminium engine block with thin press-fit cast iron cylinder liners, and aluminium DOHC 4-valve cylinder heads. The camshafts are chain-driven. The two 1.8 L members of the family, the 1ZZ and 2ZZ, use different bore and stroke. The former was optimised for economy, with torque emphasised in lower revolutions per minute operating range, while the latter is a "square" design optimised for high-RPM torque, yielding higher peak power. The ZZ family replaced the extremely popular cast-iron block 4A engines.

Toyota engine names are interpreted as follows. The leading number denotes the generation, and the next one or two letters, specify the engine family. The remaining letters, following a hyphen, describe the engine's major features. For example, the 2ZZ-GE can be decoded as being the second generation of the ZZ engine series and features a performance-oriented cylinder head with widely angled valves (G) and electronic fuel injection (E).

1ZZ

1ZZ-FE

The 1ZZ-FE is a  version built in Buffalo, West Virginia. Compression ratio is 10.0:1. It uses MPFI, has VVT-i (1998-99 1ZZ engines don't have VVT-i), and features fracture-split forged powder metal connecting rods, one-piece cast camshafts, and either a cast aluminum intake manifold or a molded plastic intake manifold.

A factory supported bolt-on supercharger kit was sold for the 2003–2004 Corolla and Matrix by Toyota Racing Development, and Pontiac Vibe by GM Performance.

Its production in Cambridge, Ontario was discontinued in December 2007.

Applications:

 Toyota Corolla CE/LE/S/VE, Fielder, Runx (Japan), Altis (Asia)
 Toyota Corolla Spacio
 Toyota Corolla Verso
 Toyota Allion
 Toyota Premio
 Toyota Vista and Vista Ardeo
 WiLL VS
 Toyota Caldina
 Toyota RAV4
 Chevrolet Prizm
 Pontiac Vibe
 Toyota Celica GT
 Toyota Matrix 
 Toyota Avensis
 Toyota Opa
 Toyota Isis
 Toyota Wish
 Lotus Elise
 Toyota MR2

Toyota announced a voluntary recall of 2005 to 2008 Toyota Corollas and Matrixes equipped with 1ZZ-FE engines. The issue involves the engine control module, and includes the potential for it to develop a crack on the module's circuit board, which can result in the car not starting, the transmission shifting harshly, or the engine stalling. Additionally, Pontiac announced a voluntary recall of Pontiac Vibes from years 2005 to 2008 for the same issue.

1ZZ-FED

The 1ZZ-FED is similar to the 1ZZ-FE but is built separately in the Shimoyama plant. It uses Multi-point fuel injection, VVT-i and has larger 32mm intake valves and 27.5mm exhaust valves with corresponding revisions to the ports, resulting in higher power output compared to the 2002-2008 1ZZ-FE.

Applications:
 Toyota Celica GT
 Toyota MR2 Spyder
 Toyota Wish 1.8
 WiLL VS 1.8

1ZZ-FBE
Special modified 1ZZ-FE that can run on E100 Ethanol.

Applications:
 Toyota Corolla (Brazil only) | 100 kW | 134,4 hp |

LJ479Q
Internal code of 1ZZ-FE engine for SAIC-GM-Wuling cars.

Applications:

Baojun 530
Baojun 560
Baojun 730/Wuling Cortez
Wuling Rongguang truck
Wuling Zhengcheng

2ZZ

2ZZ-GE

The 2ZZ-GE is a  version built in Japan, in collaboration with Yamaha Motor Corporation. It uses Multi-point Fuel Injection, VVTL-i, and features forged steel connecting rods. Compression ratio is 11.5:1, but necessitating "premium" gasoline (91 octane or above in the (R+M)/2 scale used in North America). The differing power figures from 2004 through 2006 are due to changes in dynamometer testing procedures. Due to noise regulations, Toyota recalled them for a flash of the PCM to up their output to classify them in the more lenient "sports car" noise category. The addition of a non-intercooled supercharger to the Elise SC produces  with a considerable weight saving. The supercharged engines are not labeled 2ZZ-GZE.

Unique to the ZZ family, the 2ZZ-GE utilizes a dual camshaft profile system (the "L" in VVTL-i, known by enthusiasts and engineers alike as "lift" similar to Honda's VTEC) to produce the added power without an increase in displacement or forced induction. The 2ZZ-GE was the first production engine to combine cam-phasing variable valve timing with dual-profile variable valve lift in the American market. The table below lists the specifications of the two camshaft profiles.

Toyota commissioned Yamaha to design the 2ZZ-GE, based on Toyota's ZZ block, for high-RPM operation and producing a power peak near the top of the RPM range. The high-output cam profile is not activated until approximately 6,200 rpm, (lift set-points are between 6,000–6,700 rpm depending on the vehicle) and will not engage until the engine has reached at least . The Toyota PCM electronically limits RPM to about 8,200 RPM via fuel and/or spark cut. The "lift" engagement and the engine redline vary by application. Lotus 2ZZ-GEs are rev limited to 8,500 RPM, for example, whereas Celicas were rev limited to 7,900 to 8,200 RPM in North America, depending on the model year. Consequently, it is impossible to "over-rev" the engine with the throttle alone; a downshift from a higher gear must be involved. A typical "over-rev" can damage the oil pump, commonly disintegrating the lobe ring, resulting in damage similar to the picture at right. The oil pump is the Achilles heel of the 2ZZ, though incidents are rare and usually occur due to fault of the driver. Even the briefest period of oil starvation is usually fatal to this engine design.

For the first few years of production, the engines were notorious for failing "lift bolts". This did not damage the engine, but would hamper performance as the high output cam profile was unable to properly engage. Toyota fixed the problem in late 2002 with a redesigned bolt that was installed on later engines. Earlier engines with the problematic bolts can be fixed via a Toyota-issued TSB simply requiring the new bolt to be installed in place of the old one.

The 2004 and newer Matrix and Corolla XRS models were equipped with smog pumps and have an extra hole above each exhaust port in the engine head and manifold where air is injected to achieve complete fuel burning before the exhaust stream reaches the catalyst. All 2ZZ-GE heads from 03/03 onwards carry this modification even if the vehicle does not have the air injection system.

The high-pressure die-cast aluminum alloy engine block of the 2ZZ-GE featured Metal Matrix Composite (MMC) reinforced cylinder walls. MMC is a reinforcement material composed of ceramic parts and fibers.

Applications:

 Toyota Celica SS-II (Japan)
 Toyota Celica GT-S (USA)
 Toyota Celica 190/T-Sport (UK)
 Toyota Celica SX (Australia, /)
 Toyota Celica ZR (Australia, /)
 Toyota Corolla Sportivo (Australia, /)
 Toyota Celica TS (Europe)
 Toyota Corolla T Sport Compressor  (Europe, supercharged)
 Toyota Corolla XRS (USA)
 Toyota Corolla Fielder Z Aero Tourer (Japan)
 Toyota Corolla "RunX Z Aero Tourer" (Japan)
 Toyota Corolla RunX RSi (South Africa, /)
 Toyota Matrix XRS (USA)
 Pontiac Vibe GT (USA)
 Toyota Voltz Z (Japan)
 WiLL VS 1.8
Lotus Elise (North America/UK)
Lotus Exige (USA/UK, 190 hp NA & 243 hp supercharged)
 Lotus Exige CUP 260 (USA/UK, supercharged)
Lotus 2-Eleven (USA/UK, supercharged)

3ZZ

3ZZ-FE
The 3ZZ-FE is a  engine unit built in Japan for models built from 2000 to 2010. It features SMP pistons v/s Toyota made in 1ZZ-FE engine. The preferred engine oil is 5W30 API grade SL/SM.

It is found in the Toyota Corolla Altis which is sold in Asian countries such as Singapore, Malaysia, Philippines, Thailand, Pakistan (as SE Saloon) and Taiwan; the Toyota Corolla sedan, hatchback and station wagon sold in Sri Lanka, parts of Europe and the Middle East; and the Toyota Corolla XLi sedan in Brazil. In South Africa, the motor can be found in the RunX 160 and Corolla 160.

Applications:
 Toyota Corolla (Europe & Middle East)
 Toyota Corolla Altis (Asia; E120 and E140 models)
 Toyota Corolla RunX 160 (South Africa)
 Toyota Corolla XLi (Brazil)
 Toyota Avensis (Europe)

4ZZ

4ZZ-FE
The 4ZZ-FE is a  version.

Applications:
 Toyota Corolla (E110) (2000 facelift)
 Toyota Corolla (E120)
 Toyota Auris

See also
 List of Toyota engines

References

External links

 JDM Spec Engines - Toyota 2ZZ-GE Engine 
 ZZ-GE Tech Notes
 Toyota Paper: Development of the High Speed 2ZZ-GE Engine 

Zz
Straight-four engines
Gasoline engines by model